The Monastery of Santa María de Sopetrán is a ruined Spanish Benedictine monastery located next to the town of Torre del Burgo, although in the municipality of Hita, Guadalajara. Its origin dates to the 7th century, although the current structure dates from the end of the 11th century. Of the architectural remains, the southern and eastern wings are best preserved.  The building is indexed in the Spanish heritage register of Bien de Interés Cultural since 1994.

A memorial chapel is located at the hermitage a few hundred yards away from the monastery. Pilgrimages to the well, located under the altar, occur in September.

References

Bibliography 

 Herrera Casado, Antonio (2005). Monasterios y conventos de Castilla-La Mancha. Guadalajara, AAECHE Ediciones.

External links 

Christian monasteries in Spain
Church ruins in Spain
Christian monasteries established in the 11th century
Bien de Interés Cultural landmarks in the Province of Guadalajara